Barbuda Independence Movement may refer to:

 Barbuda Independence Movement (political party), a former political party in Barbuda
 Barbuda People's Movement, which introduced Barbuda's secession request into the 15th Parliament of Antigua and Barbuda